Lake Arrowhead is a census-designated place in the town of Rome, Adams County, Wisconsin, United States. Its population was 838 as of the 2010 census.

References

Census-designated places in Adams County, Wisconsin
Census-designated places in Wisconsin